P. J. Nolan (born 9 October 1987) is an Irish sportsperson. He plays hurling with his local club Askamore Kilrush and also plays hurling for the Wexford senior team.

References

1987 births
Living people
Wexford inter-county hurlers
Askamore Kilrush hurlers